Barrow Colliery was a coal mine in Worsborough, South Yorkshire, England. It was first dug in 1873, with the first coal being brought to the surface in January 1876. It was the scene of a major incident in 1907 when seven miners died. After 109 years of coaling operations, the mine was closed in May 1985.

History
The mine was located in Blacker on the south side of Worsborough, South Yorkshire, but was called Barrow Colliery after the owners who sunk the mine, The Barrow Haematite Steel Company, which had other coal mines in operation though mainly in the Cumbrian and Lancashire coalfields. The company had purchased land in 1872 next to a former mine, Worsborough Park Colliery, that had been abandoned. Digging started in 1873, although coal was not won until 1876 after 18 months' worth of Digging. The mine operated for 109 years with a pause in production during the UK miners' strike.

Both No. 2 and 3 shafts drove into the Silkstone seam.

Seven men died at the pit in November 1907. A cage in No. 3 shaft, with seventeen men inside it (12 in the upper deck, five in the lower) had been lowered to allow a miner to get off at the Thorncliffe stage. The two men in charge of the cage (called onsetters) rushed through their safety sequence and as a result, the cage was hauled up the shaft before it had been uncoupled from the shaft wall. Whilst cage accidents were commonplace in mines, many coroner's inquests recorded accidental death as their outcomes; in the case of Barrow, two men who were operating the cage, were found guilty of "great carelessness and negligence, [but] not criminal negligence". The closed Worsborough Park Colliery, which was adjacent to Barrow Colliery, suffered a similar accident in 1839 when four miners (three from the same family) were killed when the rope on the cage snapped and they fell  to their deaths.

In 1932, the Barrow Haematite Steel Company merged with the Barnsley Main and Monk Bretton colliery companies to form the Barrow Barnsley Main Collieries Limited. This venture was nationalised in 1947 into the National Coal Board who remained its owners until it was closed in 1985. Most of the output from Barrow was destined to be exported through the dock at Immingham Dock bound for Europe.

When the miners' strike ended in March 1985, Arthur Scargill led the miners back to the pithead at Barrow Colliery with a lone Scottish piper playing a lament. When they reached the gates of Barrow, a flying picket demonstration with miners from the Kent Coalfield, were still protesting, so the procession turned back. Scargill was later quoted as saying that "I've never crossed a picket line." Just two months later in May 1985, the pit was closed owing to geological problems. Subsidence from the mine had already caused a canal basin on the Worsborough branch of the Dearne and Dove Canal to be re-inforced in the early part of the 20th century.

A local brass band that had started up in 1906 had its ranks swelled by members of the mining community from Barrow Colliery. The band was renamed the Barrow Colliery Brass Band, but sponsorship waned during the run down of the coal mining industry in the area. In the 1990s, the band was then sponsored by a local building society, then the local paper. It still survives as a self-funding collective.

References

External links
Barnsley Brass band website

1907 disasters in the United Kingdom
1907 in England
Coal mines in the Metropolitan Borough of Barnsley
History of Barnsley
Underground mines in England
Coal mining disasters in England
Disasters in Yorkshire
Coal mines in South Yorkshire
1985 disestablishments in England
1873 establishments in England